Lourde Nagar is located in the Thrissur district of Kerala state, India. It borders Chetuva to the north and Pulinchode to the south. To the west is the NH-17 and to the east is Canoli Canal. The native languages are Malayalam & English, most people speak Malayalam. It depends on Persian Gulf countries for income.

Coordinates 
Latitude 8.5878    Longitude 76.9770

Religious organizations 
St Mary's Lourdes Church

Transport
Nearest airport: Cochin International Airport, Kochi - 67km
Nearest railway stations: Guruvayoor - 7km, Thrissur - 29km

References

Villages in Thrissur district